Suleyman Demirel University (abbreviated as SDU) is a private university in Kaskelen, Almaty, Kazakhstan. It is named after Süleyman Demirel, the former prime minister and president of Turkey.

The university was established in 1996, by the initiatives of the president of Kazakhstan, Nursultan Nazarbayev, and the former president of Turkey, Suleyman Demirel.

Types of programs offered

SDU offers full-time degree programs.

Undergraduate degrees are taught at four faculties, which are divided into specific professions. The university building and campus are being expanded, which means other areas are expected to be added.

Master’s degrees can be obtained at SDU in fourteen areas and are instructed in English.

Advanced language courses are offered for all at SDU Continuous Education Center, who are intending to learn English and Turkish for academic and business purposes. Generally, almost all interested people can attend. Furthermore, specially designed IELTS and TOEFL courses are taught and trained by highly qualified language instructors.

Faculties

Faculty of Education and Humanities

The Faculty of Education and Humanities offers possibilities for interdisciplinary work, as well as specialization in the fields of foreign language studies, the study of a foreign language (French, Turkish or Chinese), translation studies and Kazakh language and literature. SDU students learn languages through the medium of the target foreign language.
 Two Foreign Languages
 Translation Studies
 Kazakh Language and Literature
 Philology
 Foreign Philology
 Mathematics (pedagogical)
 Physics & Informatics 
 Chemistry & Biology

SDU Business school
Apart from degree programs, the faculty offers specialized training programs, research and consultancy services to the organizations, executives and professionals in the public and private sectors.
 Economics
 Finance
 Management
 Digital marketing
 Accounting and Audit

Faculty of Law and Social Sciences
In the final year, extra courses are taught by orienting and relocating students into more specific majors, such as civil, state jurisdiction, criminal law, international law, and others. Additionally, law students conduct introductory practical collaborations with law enforcement agencies, since modern lawyer should be able to deal with the flow of changes and working diverse legal issues. These majors can be acquired at this faculty.
 Applied Law
 International law
 History
 International relations
 Journalism

Faculty of Engineering and Natural sciences
The main areas taught at the Faculty of Engineering cover fundamental and advanced knowledge in the development of integrated web applications, algorithms, software designing, database systems, discrete mathematics, logical programming, cryptography, computer networks, computer simulation, and others. Additionally, information architecture, design, and processing in the information systems framework are practiced. Final year students in Mathematics are expected to study specific pedagogical issues at schools and other educational institutions.
 Information Systems
 Computer Systems and Software
 Mathematics (scientific)
 Mathematical and Computer modeling

Postgraduate degree programs
Master’s degree and PhD programs are offered by Suleyman Demirel University. Postgraduate programs are based on international postgraduate programs with instruction in English. Training sessions are usually flexible according to the convenience of students.

Master’s degree courses are divided into two directions — scientific-educational and specialized areas — and taught in fourteen fields.
 Economics 
 Financial technology
 Management
 Data Science 
 Financial mathematics
 Computer Systems and Software
 Mathematics
 Mathematics (pedagogy)
 Kazakh Language and Literature
 Foreign Language: Two Foreign Languages
 Public law
 IT law 
 Media studies and journalism 
 Data journalism

PhD programs are offered in five fields:
 Management
 Computer Systems and Software
 Kazakh Language and Literature
 Foreign Language: Two Foreign Languages
 Mathematics (pedagogy)

Tuition fees
SDU provides some successful students with financial support, such as scholarships, discounts, graduate assistantships and on-campus employment opportunities.

International relations/partners

SDU actively participates in education and education projects in global level. These relations focus on development and strengthening the university’s position in the international scene.

SDU established partnership ties with 46 educational institutions, universities and international organizations.

References
Suleyman Demirel University#References

1996 establishments in Kazakhstan
Universities in Kazakhstan
Educational institutions established in 1996